Damn It's 2 Early is the second CD of live music recorded on The Dudley & Bob Show released by the show and radio station KLBJ.

Track listing
Steve Poltz: "Sugar Boogers (Answering Machine Song)" (Poltz) – 0:45
Carolyn Wonderland: "Judgement Day Blues" (Brown) – 3:11
They Might Be Giants: "Boss of Me" (They Might Be Giants) – 0:56
Rachel Loy: "The Same Man" (Loy) – 2:35
Brian Van Der Ark: "Photograph" (Willis) – 2:31
Wideawake: "Bigger Than Ourselves" (Wideawake) – 3:15
Jane Bond: "Sure Would Go Good" (Walker) – 2:14
Jimmy Lafave: "Never Is a Moment" (Lafave) – 4:14
Hayseed Dixie: "Poop in a Jar" (Wheeler) – 2:23
Li'l Cap'n Travis: "Lonesome and Losin'" (Li'l Cap'n Travis) – 4:42
Reckless Kelly: "Nobody's Girl" (Braun, Braun) – 2:57
Skunkweed: "Open Minded Redneck" (Waddy, Brown) – 3:10
Steven Fromholz: "I Game Her a Ring" (Fromholz) – 2:22
Bruce Robison: "What Would Willie Do" (Robison) – 4:23
Ray Wylie Hubbard: "Screw You We're From Texas" (Hubbard) – 3:21
Ruthie Foster: "Jordan" (Traditional) – 3:14
Terri Hendrix with Lloyd Maines: "Wallet" (Hendrix) – 2:36
Monte Montgomery: "Took Too Long" (Montgomery) – 4:12
Wendy Colonna: "M'aider" (Colonna) – 3:38
Warren Haynes: "Beautifully Broken" (Haynes, Louis) – 3:37
Steve Poltz: "You Were Meant for Me" Viva Las Vegas version (Poltz, Jewel) – 8:56
The Gourds: "Gin and Juice" (Casey, Young, Finch, Broadus) – 6:06
Bob Schneider: "If I Only Had a Brain" (Arlen, Harburg) – 2:22

References

The Dudley & Bob Show albums
2003 live albums
2000s comedy albums